9Go! is an Australian free-to-air digital television multichannel, which was launched by the Nine Network on 9 August 2009, replacing Nine Guide.  It is a youthful channel that offers a mix of comedy, reality, general entertainment, movies, animation and drama aimed at people between the ages of 2 to 18.

History

2009: Origins and launch
The general concept for GO! was revealed on 23 March 2009, with the Nine Network announcing their intention to start a standard-definition variety-based multichannel, launched midway through 2009. The channel's name and branding was first revealed as GO!99 on 14 April 2009 by TV Tonight, a blog dedicated to Australian television.

The channel's final name was confirmed by the Nine Network via A Current Affair as GO! on 15 July 2009, as well as multi-coloured logo variations.

It was then followed by an episode of Wipeout, the first programme to air on the new channel.

Darwin received the channel in October 2010 (over a year after other capital cities started transmitting the multi channel). From December 2010, Nine Network affiliate Imparja Television commenced transmission of the GO! channel to viewers in remote areas of Central, Northern and Eastern Australia,
before expanding to Eastern South Australia on 11 November 2011.

There have been reports that GO!'s technical launch had caused a significant number of digital TV receivers to no longer pick up Nine's digital channels. In response, Nine established a helpline for viewers experiencing problems or requiring assistance to tune in to the new channel.

On 24 November 2009, the channel launched via Foxtel Cable on channel 129.

After major demands for the channel's theme song (which was written specifically for the channel, going as far as remixes of the 1-minute cut being played in clubs), it was released independently by Noise International on 4 December 2009, having promised a month earlier. A music video was also produced (notable for the usage of neon dancers), which was regularly shown as a filler on the channel.

2010–2014
GO! celebrated its first birthday in 2010 by playing movies every night at 10pm during the month of August 2010. GO! also played a mini clip during the commercial breaks thanking everyone for watching GO!.

In September 2010, GO! aired a promo promoting new shows using the song All Eyes on Me by Sammy Small, licensed from Extreme Music.

GO! introduced Newsbursts, a news-break filler program in 2010. Presented by Sophie Walsh, these would usually feature a few breaking news stories and the weather. These were later dropped in 2011, replaced by repeats of Nine Newsbreak.

GO! received a new on-air presentation for 2011. GO! also played a mini clip after programs during Summer 2010/2011, featuring the song "Hello" by The Potbelleez, using the slogan "Let's GO! 2011" to promote new shows airing on the channel. This presentation remained (mostly) unchanged for the next few years.

2014–2016: Rebrand and refocus
On 26 November 2015, the Nine Network introduced a network-wide rebrand of all of its digital channels with GO! being renamed 9Go!. Additionally, 9Go! was moved to channel 93, but a simulcast currently remains available on channel 99. Later, 9Go!'s on-air theme was changed for a continuous design across all of its channels. This included a new look for program listings, program advertisements and promos and introduced the in program classifications.

2016–present: Regional media shakeup and beyond
Nine announced that it had signed a new affiliation deal with Southern Cross Austereo on 29 April 2016, replacing WIN Television as the primary Nine affiliate starting 1 July 2016. Consequently, 9Go! was broadcast by Southern Cross into Regional Queensland, Southern NSW/ACT and Regional Victoria on channel 53, also on TDT in Tasmania on channel 53.

On 12 December 2016, 9Go!'s daytime schedule was mostly reformatted into a children's programming block branded Go! Kids. Children's programming aired from 6am to 6pm on 9Go! in addition to being available via streaming on the 9Now service, with regular programming broadcast outside of those hours. In late 2019, the Go! Kids block was no longer in this network because the cancellation of Kids' WB and their long-running output deal with Warner Bros, but remained online instead.

Nine announced that WIN Television has returned as the primary Nine regional affiliate from 2021. Consequently 9Go! got bumped up to channel 82.

Programming
Original plans for 9Go! suggested it would consist of a mix of entertainment and lifestyle programming (this rule wasn't featured until the launch of future Female-oriented HD channel 9Gem in 2010). However, this branding was replaced by a youth-orientated light-entertainment channel instead. 9Go!'s programming is generally structured under nightly themed blocks, which consists of comedy on Sunday, all new reality shows on Tuesday, sci-fi on Wednesday, female-skewed drama on Thursday (until the launch of 9Gem, when it was replaced by movies instead), and movies on Friday. Movies screen with "limited and brief commercial breaks". The schedule is designed not to cannibalise viewers from the main Nine channel.

It was announced in June 2009 that the Nine Network had signed a $500 million deal with Warner Bros. to continue its current output deal for another five years from 2011 to 2015. The deal helped Nine retain existing content (including many television series and films), as well as providing new content for both its primary channel, 9Gem (launched in 2010) and 9Go!.

The network also has ongoing content new and classic film and television brands from Warner Bros. Pictures, New Line Cinema, DC Studios, Warner Animation Group, Castle Rock Entertainment, Village Roadshow Pictures, StudioCanal, Lionsgate, Metro-Goldwyn-Mayer, Sony Pictures, DreamWorks Pictures, DreamWorks Animation, Paramount Pictures, Paramount Animation, Nickelodeon Movies, Universal Pictures and Illumination.

Current programming

Children's

 Adventure Time (2011-present)
 Alien TV (2019–present)
 The Amazing World of Gumball (2014–present)
 Bakugan: Armored Alliance
 Bakugan: Geogan Rising
 Bakugan: Evolutions
 Barbie: It Takes Two
 Berry Bees (2019–present)
 Beyblade Burst Surge
 Beyblade Burst QuadDrive
 Dumbotz
 The Gamers 2037 (2020–present)
 Jungle Beat (TV series)
 Lego City Adventures
 Lego Friends
 Lego Jurassic World: Legend of Isla Nublar (2019–present)
 Lego Monkie Kid
 Lego Ninjago: Masters of Spinjitzu
 Pokémon (2016–present)
 Pokémon Journeys: The Series
 Pokémon Master Journeys: The Series
 Pokémon Ultimate Journeys: The Series
 Polly Pocket
 Power Players
 Power Rangers Dino Fury
 Smashhdown! (2018–present)
 Space Nova (shared with ABC ME)
 Teen Titans Go!
 The Tom and Jerry Show (2014–present)
 Transformers: Cyberverse
 Yu-Gi-Oh SEVENS

Preschool

 Earth to Luna! (2020–present)
 Dino Ranch (2022–present)
 Gigantosaurus (2021–present)
 Gus, the Itsy Bitsy Knight
 Spidey and His Amazing Friends

Comedy

 3rd Rock from the Sun
 Bewitched 
 Everybody Loves Raymond
 Full House
 I Dream of Jeannie
 M*A*S*H 
 Mr. Mayor
 The Nanny
 That '70s Show 
 Young Sheldon

Documentary

 Driving Test
 South Beach Tow
 Southern Justice
 Mystery Diners

Drama

 The Bionic Woman
 The Carrie Diaries

Lifestyle

 Surfing Australia TV

Light entertainment

 BattleBots
 Science of Stupid

Reality

 Airplane Repo
 Auction Hunters
 Best Ink
 Can't Pay? We'll Take It Away!
 Car SOS
 Cold Water Cowboys
 Container Wars
 Dance Moms (shared with 9Life)
 Hollywood Medium with Tyler Henry
 Keeping Up with the Kardashians
 Kourtney and Khloé Take The Hamptons
 Kourtney and Khloé Take Miami
 Kourtney and Kim Take Miami
 Kourtney and Kim Take New York
 Storage Hunters
 South Beach Tow
 Survivor
 Very Cavallari

Upcoming programming
 Bakugan: Legends (children's)
 Jellystone! (children's)
 Tom and Jerry in New York (children's)

Former programming

Adult Swim

 Aqua Teen Hunger Force
 The Brak Show
 China, IL
 Harvey Birdman, Attorney at Law
 Moral Orel
 Rick and Morty
 Robot Chicken
 Squidbillies
 The Venture Bros.

Adult animation

 Duncanville
 Father of the Pride
 Mike Tyson Mysteries
 South Park (Was on SBS Viceland, later 10 Shake)
 Supernatural: The Animation
 Watchmen: Motion Comic

Children's

 Animaniacs
 Bakugan: Battle Planet
 Barbie Dreamhouse Adventures
 Barbie Dreamtopia
 Batman: The Brave and the Bold
 Be Cool, Scooby-Doo!
 Ben 10 (2005 series)
 Ben 10 (2016 series)
 Ben 10: Alien Force
 Ben 10: Omniverse
 Ben 10: Ultimate Alien
 Beware the Batman
 Beyblade Burst
 Beyblade Burst Evolution
 Beyblade Burst Turbo
 Beyblade Burst Rise
 BrainBuzz (2018–21)
 Buzz Bumble (2014–17)
 Camp Lazlo
 Captain Flinn and the Pirate Dinosaurs (2015–19)
 Care Bears: Unlock the Magic
 Clarence
 Class of 3000
 Classic Looney Tunes
 Craig of the Creek
 Creature Mania (2018)
 Crunch Time (2016–18)
 The Day My Butt Went Psycho! (2013–19, moved to ABC ME)
 Dennis and Gnasher (2009 series) (2013–17, moved to ABC ME)
 Digimon Fusion
 Dogstar (2013–15, moved to ABC ME)
 Ed, Edd n Eddy
 Fanshaw & Crudnut (2017–20)
 Firehouse Tales
 Flash and Dash
 Flea Bitten (2013–14)
 The Flintstones
 Foster's Home for Imaginary Friends
 Generator Rex
 Green Lantern: The Animated Series
 Heidi (2015–19)
 Hi Hi Puffy AmiYumi
 Johnny Test
 The Jetsons
 Josie and the Pussycats
 Justice League Action
 Justice League Unlimited
 Kaijudo: Rise of the Duel Masters
 Kids' WB (2009–19)
 Kitchen Whiz (2013–16)
 Krypto the Superdog
 Legion of Super Heroes
 Lego City (2019)
 Lego Marvel Super Heroes (2019–20)
 Lego Nexo Knights
 Lego Star Wars: Droid Tales
 Liberty's Kids
 The Life and Times of Juniper Lee
 The Likeaballs
 Little Charmers (Moved To ABC Kids)
 Littlest Pet Shop
 Littlest Pet Shop: A World of Our Own
 Loonatics Unleashed
 The Looney Tunes Show
 Mad
 Mao Mao: Heroes of Pure Heart
 Marine Boy
 Marvel's Avengers Assemble (2019)
 Max Steel
 Mega Man: Fully Charged
 Monsuno
 Most Extreme Alien Planet Earth (2017)
 Move It (2014–18)
 My Little Pony: Friendship is Magic
 My Little Pony: Pony Life
 My Gym Partner's a Monkey
 Nate is Late (2018–21)
 The New Looney Tunes
 Over the Garden Wall
 Pinky and the Brain
 Pirate Express (2015–21)
 Power Rangers Super Megaforce
 Power Rangers Beast Morphers
 Power Rangers Dino Charge
 Power Rangers Dino Super Charge
 Power Rangers Super Ninja Steel
 Power Rangers Super Samurai
 The Powerpuff Girls (2016 series)
 Pyramid (2009–15) 
 Rabbids Invasion
 Regal Academy
 Regular Show
 Rev & Roll
 Ricky Zoom (2020–22, moved to 10 Shake)
 Robotomy
 Robocar Poli
 The All-New Scooby-Doo Show
 Scooby-Doo! Mystery Incorporated
 Scooby-Doo, Where Are You!
 Secret Mountain Fort Awesome
 Shaggy & Scooby-Doo Get a Clue!
 The Skinner Boys (2014–21)
 The Smurfs
 Sonic Boom (2015–18)
 Space Chickens in Space (2018–2022)
 SpongeBob SquarePants (March 2015-2017, now on 10 Shake)
 Squirrel Boy
 Star Wars Rebels (2019, previously on 7flix)
 Steven Universe
 Summer Camp Island
 Sym-Bionic Titan
 Tamagotchi! (2010–14)
 Tangled: The Series (2019)
 Teen Titans
 Tenkai Knights
 Thunderbirds
 Thunderbirds Are Go (shared with ABC ME)
 Tom and Jerry Tales
 Transformers: Cyberverse
 Turning Mecard
 Uncle Grandpa
 Wacky Races
 We Bare Bears
 Wild Kratts
 Winx Club
 Xiaolin Showdown
 Yo-Kai Watch
 Young Justice
 Yu-Gi-Oh!
 Yu-Gi-Oh! Arc-V
 Yu-Gi-Oh! VRAINS
 Yu-Gi-Oh! Zexal

Preschool

 Hi-5 (2012, 2017–18)
 Hiccup & Sneeze (2017–19)
 I Am Me (2020)
 Imagination Train (2015–17)
 Kate & Mim-Mim
 The Lion Guard (2019, previously on 7flix)
 Mickey and the Roadster Racers (2019)
 PAW Patrol (2014–20, now moved to 10 Shake)
 Pocoyo (2013-2018)
 Puppy Dog Pals (2019)
 Rainbow Rangers
 Sofia the First (2019, previously on 7flix)
 Sunny Bunnies
 Super Wings
 Surprises! (2012–15, 2018–20)
 Teddies (2017–20)
 Transformers: Rescue Bots (moved to 10 Shake)
 Transformers: Rescue Bots Academy
 True and the Rainbow Kingdom
 Vampirina (2019)
 William & Sparkles' Magical Tales
 Yamba's Playtime

Comedy

 2 Broke Girls (Now on 10 Peach)
 Aliens in America
 Anger Management
 Bad Robots
 The Big Bang Theory (Now on 10 Peach)
 Big School
 Blackadder
 Community (moved to ABC Comedy)
 Curb Your Enthusiasm
 Frasier (Now on 10 Peach)
 Friends (Now on 10 Peach)
 Get Smart (moved to 10 Bold)
 Green Acres
 Ground Floor
 Hellcats
 Just Shoot Me! (moved to 7flix)
 Kevin Can Wait
 The King of Queens (Now on 10 Peach)
 Little Britain
 Mad About You
 Malcolm in the Middle
 Married... with Children (moved to 7flix)
 The Middle (Now on 10 Peach and 10 Shake)
 Mike & Molly (moved on 10 Peach)
 The Mindy Project
 Mom (Now on 10 Peach)
 The New Adventures of Old Christine
 Parenthood
 The Partridge Family
 Privileged
 Reno 911! (moved to SBS Viceland)
 Rick and Morty
 Seinfeld (moved to 7mate, later 7flix, then 10 Peach)
 Spin City
 Step Dave
 Suburgatory
 Sullivan and Son
 Super Fun Night
 Two and a Half Men (Now on 10 Peach)
 Weeds

Documentary

 The Crew

Drama

 Airwolf
 Almost Human
 Arrow
 The A-Team
 The Avengers (moved to Channel 9 and 9Gem)
 Baywatch
 Bonanza
 Buck Rogers in the 25th Century
 Charlie's Angels (Moved to 7mate)
 CSI: Crime Scene Investigation 
 CSI: Miami (moved to 10 Bold)
 CSI: NY (moved to 10 Bold)
 Dante's Cove
 Dawson's Creek
 Drop Dead Diva (moved to 7two)
 The Dukes of Hazzard (moved to 7two)
 Eastwick
 ER
 The Following
 Friday Night Lights
 Fringe
 Gossip Girl
 Gotham (moved to Foxtel Networks)
 Hercules: The Legendary Journeys
 Heroes
 The Incredible Hulk
 iZombie (Moved to Stan)
 Knight Rider
 The Last Ship
 Miami Vice
 Moonlight
 New Amsterdam
 Nikita (Moved to 7flix)
 Nip/Tuck (Moved to 7flix) 
 The Originals
 Pretty Little Liars
 Primeval
 Quantum Leap
 Royal Pains
 SeaQuest DSV
 The Six Million Dollar Man
 Sliders
 Stalker
 Star Trek: The Original Series (Moved to 10 Bold)
 Starsky & Hutch
 Step Dave
 Terminator: The Sarah Connor Chronicles. (Moved to 7mate)
 Unnatural History
 V
 The Vampire Diaries
 The Wire
 Xena: Warrior Princess

Lifestyle

 Fishing Australia (Now on Channel 10)

Light entertainment

 The ARIA Music Show
 Australia's Funniest Home Videos (includes Daily Edition)
 Balls of Steel Australia 
 The Cube
 The Darren Sanders Show
 Eclipse Music TV
 The Ellen DeGeneres Show (Channel 9 encore)
 Extra
 GO! Surround Sound
 ManSpace
 Oh Sit!
 Top Gear (moved to 9Rush)
 Top Gear Australia
 Top Gear US
 Total Wipeout UK (moved to ABC ME, later on 10 Shake)
 Wipeout USA (moved to 7mate)

Factual

 Fugitive: Black Ops
 RBT
 Ten 7 Aotearoa

Anthology

 The Wonderful World of Disney (2019–20; moved to Disney+ and starting in 2023 on 7flix)

Reality

 16 and Pregnant
 American Idol
 American Ninja Warrior
 Australian Ninja Warrior (Episode 1–3, Channel 9 encore)
 The Bachelor U.S
 Bachelor Pad
 The Bachelette U.S
 Big Brother (Channel 9 encore)
 The Block (Channel 9 encore)
 The Block New Zealand
 Bridezillas
 Britain's Got Talent (moved to Channel 7)
 Cops Uncut
 Dance Your Ass Off
 Deepwater
 Dog and Beth: On the Hunt
 Dog the Bounty Hunter
 Ghost Town Gold
 The Great Australian Bake Off
 Lip Sync Battle
 Meet the Hockers
 MTV Cribs
 MTV Cribs UK
 Neighbours at War (Moved to 7two)
 The NRL Rookie
 Speeders
 Sun, Sex and Suspicious Parents
 Survivor
 Tattoo Fixers
 Teen Mom
 Tool Academy
 The Voice Australia (Channel 9 encore)
 The Voice US
 Wife Swap USA

WWE

 Total Divas
 WWE Raw
 WWE Slam City
 WWE Smackdown

Sport
NRL matches were shown on 9Go! on Friday nights if the cricket was scheduled on 9Gem in Victoria, Tasmania, South Australia and Western Australia. 9Go! also broadcast the 2015 Liverpool FC tour matches against Brisbane Roar and Adelaide United. The NBL was broadcast on 9Go! on Sundays if the cricket was scheduled on 9Gem. On 16 August 2017 it was announced that WWE programming including Monday Night Raw and Smackdown Live would air every week on the channel in a reduced 1 hour format. Raw airs on Thursdays at 11PM and Smackdown Live airs following the Friday Night Movie.

Availability
9Go! is available in standard definition in metropolitan areas through Nine Network owned-and-operated stations: TCN Sydney, GTV Melbourne, QTQ Brisbane, NWS Adelaide, STW Perth and NTD Darwin, as well as  NBN Northern New South Wales and other stations WIN Southern NSW/ACT, GTS/BKN Broken Hill NSW, AMN Griffith NSW, VTV Regional VIC, STV Mildura, RTQ Regional QLD, TVT Tasmania, GTS/BKN Spencer Gulf SA, SES/RTS Eastern SA, WOW Regional WA and Remote Central & Eastern.

Logo and identity history
When GO! was in development stages, the concept name was revealed as GO!99 on 14 April 2009 with a black and white concept logo. On 15 July 2009, news program A Current Affair confirmed the name as GO! along with a scheme of multi-coloured logos based on the original concept logo. On 2 February 2014, the channel's branding was refreshed with a new, 3D glossy logo with multi-coloured gradient variants. Following the network-wide rebrand on 26 November 2015, the channel was renamed 9Go! with the famous "nine dots" from Nine's logo integrated into then-current logo, but with the O in lowercase.

Identity history
9 August 2009 – 1 February 2014: Good to GO! (first era) (accompanied in promotional trailers by "Go!'" by Noise International feat. Sharon Muscat)
Christmas slogan (since 2009): GO! HO! HO!
2010–2012: Let's GO! (accompanied in promotional trailers by "Hello'" by The Potbelleez)
2 February 2014 – 25 November 2015: GO! For It!
26 November 2015 – present: Good to Go! (second era)

References

External links

Nine Network
Digital terrestrial television in Australia
English-language television stations in Australia
Television channels and stations established in 2009
2009 establishments in Australia
Children's television channels in Australia